Subhash Misra is a poet, development worker and UNICEF staff and an involuntary nomad.

Subhash Misra's book Gangasmriti & Other Poems was published by Writers Workshop, Kolkata, India. Columnist Khushwant Singh wrote, "We have a new talented poet joining the band of Ganga worshipers. Subhash Misra was born on its banks at Mirzapur, educated on its banks at Varanasi and made his livelihood in Calcutta by the Hoogly. In his collection of poems, Gangasmriti & Other Poems, he goes ecstatic in praise of Srishti: The Creation.

Subhash Misra’s second book of poems: ‘Exiles Always: Poems from Other Geographies’ (footnote – ) is a compilation of poems written between 2005-2013 depicting a sense of exile as he worked for Tsunami rehabilitation in Andaman & Nicobar Islands, was in the midst of  Afghanistan and then Iraq fraught with violence – religious as well as political. His poems convey loss, and loneliness but also realism and hope in varying degrees. He carries his exile with him it seems.

Subhash Misra has worked for UNICEF and has headed the Tsunami Recovery Program in Andaman & Nicobar and then contributed to the Afghanistan National Development Strategy and subsequently managing the Counter Narcotics Trust Fund for eradicating poppy cultivation as an adviser with UNDP, Kabul. He started the development organisation OASES in 1982. Subhash Misra has also contributed personal experiences to various Indian newspapers. He worked with UNICEF in Iraq and Democratic People's Republic of Korea, living for more than two years in Pyongyang, and is currently based in Bangkok where he continues to work with UNICEF, and lives with his wife.

He has two daughters both living in New York working for fashion industry and development respectively.

He also manages a poetry page on Facebook. https://www.facebook.com/Poetry-Passion-240085479383346/?ref=hl 
and, his poems can be found on the web: http://www.poemhunter.com/subhash-misra/ 
http://whyareweiniraq.com/author/author0105.htm

References

Indian male poets
Living people
UNICEF people
Indian officials of the United Nations
Year of birth missing (living people)